__notoc__

The San Francisco Theatre District is a neighborhood in San Francisco named for the legitimate theaters located there.  The district encompasses part of the Union Square shopping district and the Tenderloin and Civic Center neighborhoods. Theaters in the area include the Orpheum Theatre, Curran Theatre, Golden Gate Theatre, San Francisco Playhouse, and American Conservatory Theater (which includes The Strand and Geary Theaters).

Gallery

See also
List of theatres in San Francisco
Boston Theater District
Buffalo Theater District
Cleveland Theater District
Houston Theater District
Broadway Theater District (Los Angeles)
Theater District, New York

References

External links

Entertainment districts in California
Neighborhoods in San Francisco
.
Union Square, San Francisco
San Francisco